The National Movement of the Iranian Resistance (NAMIR) was a political organization founded by Shapour Bakhtiar in 1979. An exiled opposition to the Islamic Republic regime, the organization pursued a convergence of nationalism and constitutional liberalism and its membership included liberals, conservatives, and democratic socialists, as well as monarchists.

Leadership 
Other than Bakhtiar, who was the leader of the party, three senior members served in the capacity of the Chairman of Executive Committee: Abdolrahman Boroomand (1980–1987; March–August 1991) Mohammad Moshiri (March 1987–July 1989), Sadegh Sadireh (July 1989–March 1991).

Financial sources 
Soon after its establishment, the organization received some $500,000 contribution from Ashraf Pahlavi. Manouchehr Ghorbanifar allegedly provided them with $10 million, while Ba'athist Iraq also funded the organization with $30 million to $70, plus a $200–250,000 monthly stipend. In March 1986, the organization received contribution sum to the tune of US$100,000/month from the United States. However it was not a CIA initiative, but come directly from above by policymakers. According to Abbas Gholi Bakhtiar (Bakhtiar's cousin and a NAMIR member in charge of propaganda section), he was given a personal gift to the sum of $2 million from Saudi Arabia in 1989.

Relations with other opposition groups 
The organizations condemned the National Council of Resistance of Iran and rejected any notions of cooperation with the organization founded by Massoud Rajavi of the MEK and Abolhassan Banisadr, President of Iran removed from the office. In 1981, they formed an alliance with the Azadegan Organization, led by Bahram Aryana. They also maintained good relationship with Reza Pahlavi II and Ali Amini.

References 

Organisations of the Iranian Revolution
Secularism in Iran
1980 establishments in France
1991 disestablishments in France
Political organizations based in France
Counter-revolutionaries